FK Genclerbirliyi Sumqayit was an Azerbaijani football club based in Sumqayit. They were founded in 2003 and won the Azerbaijan First Division title the same year, gaining promotion to the Azerbaijan Premier League. They spent four seasons in the top flight, finishing 12th, 11th, 12th and final 13th in their final season. The club was dissolved in July 2008.

They were managed by Afgan Talybov, whilst Ilgar Nuriyev was the club's chairman.

Stadium 
Genclerbirliyi Sumqayit played their home matches at the Mehdi Huseynzade Stadium.

Crest and colours
Genclerbirliyi Sumqayit's home kit consisted of a white shirt with black shorts, whilst their away kit was yellow shirts with black shorts.

League and domestic cup history

Notes
Gänclärbirliyi Sumqayit were excluded from the competition.

Records

Honours
Azerbaijan First Division
 Winners (1): 2003–04

References

Genclerbirliyi Sumqayit
Sport in Sumgait
2003 establishments in Azerbaijan
2008 disestablishments in Azerbaijan
Association football clubs established in 2003